Knob Creek can refer to:

Several streams in the US, including:
 Knob Creek, in Izard County, Arkansas
 Knob Creek, in Bullitt County, Kentucky
 Knob Creek, in Graves County, Kentucky
 Knob Creek (Miami Creek), a stream in Missouri
 Knob Creek (South Grand River), a stream in west central Missouri
 Knob Creek (Stouts Creek), a stream in Missouri
 Knob Creek, in Cleveland County, North Carolina
 Knob Creek, in Lauderdale County, Tennessee
 Knob Creek, in Lawrence County, Tennessee
 Knob Creek, in Sevier County, Tennessee
 Knob Creek, in Washington County, Tennessee

Other
 Knob Creek Farm, boyhood home of Abraham Lincoln, in LaRue County, US
 Knob Creek (bourbon), a brand of bourbon whiskey made by Beam Suntory